Alexandrovka is a rural locality (a selo) and the administrative centre of Alexandrovsky Selsoviet, Meleuzovsky District, Bashkortostan, Russia. The population was 520 as of 2010. There are 6 streets.

Geography 
Alexandrovka is located 30 km northeast of Meleuz (the district's administrative centre) by road. Kutlubulatovo is the nearest rural locality.

References 

Rural localities in Meleuzovsky District